Cloche (French for "bell") or la cloche (French for "the bell") may refer to:

 Armoured cloche, bell-shaped turrets of the Maginot Line
 Battement en cloche, a classical ballet movement
 Bell (instrument), especially in music directions
 Cloche (agriculture), a covering for protecting plants from cold temperatures
 Cloche (tableware), a silver dish cover
 Cloche hat, a close-fitting women's hat 
 Cloche Leythal Pastalia, a character in videogame Ar tonelico II: Melody of Metafalica

People 
 Antonin Cloche (died 1720), Master of the Order of Preachers from 1686 to 1720
 James de la Cloche (1644?–1669?), an alleged would-be-illegitimate son of Charles II of England
 Maurice Cloche (1907–1990), French film director and producer
 Robert Cloche de La Malmaison (died 1717), French governor of Guadeloupe

Places 
 La Cloche Mountains, also called La Cloche Range, mountain range in Northern Ontario, Canada
 La Cloche Provincial Park, Ontario, Canada
 Fort La Cloche, historic Hudson's Bay Company post in Northern Ontario, Canada

See also
 Clochette
 La Clochette